Gordon Frederick Rorke (born 27 June 1938) is a former Australian cricketer who played in four Test matches in 1959.

Rorke made his Test debut in January 1959 in the Fourth Test of The Ashes series against England in Adelaide. It was an impressive debut, taking 3/23 off 18.1 eight-ball overs in the first innings (including the wickets of Colin Cowdrey for 84, Tom Graveney and Willie Watson) and 2/70 from 34 overs in the second innings. Rorke claimed three wickets in the Fifth Test at Melbourne a fortnight later, and was selected to tour Pakistan and India the following year.

A six-foot five-inch (or 1.96 m) "Blond Giant", Rorke was the fastest Australian bowler and accused of throwing by the English press, but this paled beside his excessive dragging. With his seven-foot stride, if dragging his rear foot a yard over the crease he could be only eighteen yards from the batsman when he finally delivered the ball. At times he seemed impossible to score from. Fred Trueman was no balled for dragging his foot a couple of inches over the crease and wrote "It was really annoying as this umpire seemed to allow Gordon Rorke to bowl with both his feet over the front line!". One picture showed him with his rear foot past the bowling crease before he had even begun to drag. Colin Cowdrey joked "I was frightened that he might tread on my toes".

Rorke did not play Pakistan in the opening three Tests of the 1959–60 tour, but was selected when Ray Lindwall withdrew from the opening Test against India at Delhi. Rorke played little role in the following Test at Kanpur, bowling only two overs before being forced to retire ill. His situation became so grave he was flown back to Australia for medical treatment. Following this illness, Rorke struggled in first-class cricket, eventually losing his place in the New South Wales Sheffield Shield squad in 1964. Since the end of his playing career he has had three knee replacements. He and his wife have four children and 11 grandchildren.

References

Sources
 Brown, A. (1988) The Pictorial History of Cricket, Bison Books: London. 
 Frith, D. (1987) Pageant of Cricket, The MacMillan Company of Australia: South Melbourne. . 
 Trueman, F. (2005) As It Was, Pan Books: London. .
 Tyson, F. (1982) The Cricketer Who Laughed, Stanley Paul: London. .
 Willis, B. & Murphy, P. (1986) Starting with Grace, Stanley Paul: London.

External links

1938 births
Living people
Australia Test cricketers
New South Wales cricketers
Australian cricketers
Cricketers from Sydney